Listen, Little Man! (German: Rede an den kleinen Mann) is a 1945 essay by Austro-Hungarian-American psychologist Wilhelm Reich outlining his libertarian socialist political philosophy, in particular its views on direct action as the only means for the working class to achieve liberation. It was translated into English in 1948 by Theodore Peter Wolfe.

External links

https://archive.org/details/ListenLittleMan

1945 essays
Marxist books
Works by Wilhelm Reich